The Test of Legal English Skills (TOLES) is a series of practical and profession-led English examinations for lawyers and law students. The TOLES exams are issued by Global Legal English, who are members of the International Division of the Law Society of England and Wales. The TOLES exams are designed to be vocational legal English exams rather than exams written by or intended for academics. The TOLES exams are not formally placed on the Common European Framework of Reference for Languages as the legal content of the exam is too high for them to be seen as purely English language exams.

Introduction
The TOLES exams were started in 2000 in response to demand from law firms and other employers of lawyers. The exams are offered at 3 levels. These are TOLES Foundation, TOLES Higher and TOLES Advanced. All of the exams focus on developing commercial awareness as well as accuracy and the development of a specialist commercial legal vocabulary. The stated aim of TOLES is to meet the English language skills standards of the group of law firms known as the Magic Circle (law) and other leading commercial enterprises. The exams are not a test of English law but test knowledge of legal English within the context of English and international law. The main topics of the exams include commercial contracts drafted in English, forms of business and the vocabulary of finance.
TOLES courses are offered around the world and in the UK

Theee levels
TOLES Foundation is the first level in the TOLES series. It is for beginners/elementary level students of legal English. This exam tests reading and writing skills. The exam takes 90 minutes.

TOLES Higher is the second level in the TOLES series. It is for intermediate level students of legal English. This exams tests reading, writing and listening skills. The exam takes 120 minutes.

TOLES Advanced is the highest level in the TOLES series. It is for advanced level students of legal English. This exam tests reading and writing skills. The exam takes 120 minutes.

Candidature

The TOLES exams are suitable for international lawyers and law students who are seeking employment in the field of international commercial law. This includes law students who are looking for employment in top level international law firms, the law departments of international corporations and local government. The majority of TOLES candidates between 2000 and 2018 have taken the exams at a British Council school or at a private or public university. The exams are not suitable for native-English speakers.

References

English language tests